Cornet was originally the lowest grade of commissioned officer in a British cavalry troop, the modern equivalent being a second lieutenant. The rank was abolished by the 1871 Cardwell Reforms, which replaced it with sub-lieutenant.  Although obsolete, the term is still used as an internal title of address when referring to a second lieutenant within the British Army regiments of the Blues and Royals and Queen's Royal Hussars.

The cornet rank was also used by other nations such as the Imperial Russian Army and the Prussians.

Etymology
A cornet or "cornet of horse" was in the 17th and 18th century a term for a group of cavalry (typically 100–300 men), so-called because it was accompanied by a cornet player (a trumpet-like instrument, from Old French cornet (14c.), Latin cornū, "horn"). Later "cornet" came to refer to the fifth commissioned officer in a cavalry troop, who carried the colours; it never referred to the cornet player himself. An alternative etymology claims that the term is derived from a cornette, a woman's headdress, with a strip of lace hanging down from a headdress against the cheeks; later it referred to the pennon of a cavalry troop.

History 
The rank was in use by the time of the English Civil War. Among famous cornets in that conflict were George Joyce, Robert Stetson, and Ninian Beall.  It was abolished along with the purchase of commissions in the Army Reform Act of 1871, replaced by second lieutenant.

The ranks of ensign and cornet were abolished in the US Army in 1815.

The rank also existed in other nations' cavalry troops, such as those of Denmark (kornet), Sweden (kornett) and Imperial Russia (корнет), and by the Continental Army in the American War of Independence. General Alexander Macomb was initially commissioned a cornet in a career in which he eventually became Commanding General of the United States Army. It is still used in the artillery and cavalry divisions of the Netherlands (kornet).

The rank of field cornet (veldkornet) was used for the senior officer of a ward or sub-district in the independent republican states of the Transvaal and Oranje-Vrystaat in late 19th century South Africa. They were elected by the commandos of their ward for periods of three years. In the case of large wards, an assistant field cornet could also be chosen. The rank was reminiscent of the Dutch use in cavalry troops that the commandos most closely resembled. In apartheid-era South Africa, the rank of field cornet was used in the South African Army from 1960 to 1968.

Traditional duties 
The subaltern rank of cornet was the equivalent of the contemporary infantry rank of ensign; today both have been supplanted by the rank of second lieutenant. The cornet carried the troop standard, known as a "guidon".

See also
 Fänrik
 Fähnrich

References

Military ranks of the British Army
Household Cavalry